Gonzalo Ramos Deféminis (born 16 May 1991) is an Uruguayan footballer who plays as an attacking midfielder or playmaker for Atenas.

References

1991 births
Living people
Footballers from Montevideo
Uruguayan footballers
Uruguayan expatriate footballers
Association football midfielders
Club Nacional de Football players
C.A. Cerro players
Club Puebla players
Racing Club de Montevideo players
Carlos A. Mannucci players
Atenas de San Carlos players
Uruguayan Primera División players
Uruguayan Segunda División players
Peruvian Primera División players
Liga MX players
Uruguayan expatriate sportspeople in Mexico
Uruguayan expatriate sportspeople in Peru
Expatriate footballers in Mexico
Expatriate footballers in Peru